Aaj Entertainment is a Pakistani entertainment channel operated by Recorder Television Network (RTN). This channel was launched on 1 December 2015, and is owned by Business Recorder Group.

History 
Business Recorder Group launched Aaj Entertainment on December 1, 2015.

Current programming

Comedy
Akkar Bakkar
Band Baj Gaya
Hum Sub Ajeeb Se Hain 2

Drama Series
Unchahee
Baichain Dil
Dil Dhadkan Aur Tum
Teri Chahtein

Reality Shows
 The Couple Show - Season 2

Infotainment
Aaj Zara Hutt Kay
Hollywood Haftawaar
View 360

Talk Shows
 Aaj Pakistan

Lifestyle
Aaj Ka Tarka

Former programming

Anthology
4 Din Ki Zindagi
 Court Room
Imaan Aur Yaqeen
Kaash
Kahani Ke Peechay
Meri Kahani
Olivia Tera Shukriya
Pachtawa
Qaidi Number
Such Beetiaan
Weham

Dramas
 Aitebaar
Baichain Dil
 Charagar
 Dharkan
 Dil Deewana
 Dil Dharkan Aur Tum
 Gumshuda
 Jeenay Ke Liye
Jo Na Mil Sakay
 Kaffara
 Koyal
Main Kamli
 Mere Humdum
 Meri Mishaal
 Nayaab
 Pakeezah
 Rangdaari
 Rishta Hai Jaise Khwab Sa
 Sajda E Ishq
 Shararatein
 Zid

Horror/Supernatural
 Lal Mai

Soap
Akeli Reh Gayi Main

Sitcom
3 Khawa 3
Aunty Parlour Wali
Biwi Se Biwi Tak
Chowki No 420
Hum Sab Ajeeb Se Hain
Lollypop
Urban Desi

Talk Show
Conversation with Sonia Rehman
Gol Gapain
The Barkat Uzmi Show
The Couple Show
You & Me This Morning

Special Programming
Baran-e-Rehmat-  Ramzan Transmission with Ejaz Aslam & Madeeha Naqvi (2017)
Janay Say Pehlay - Telefilm
Ramzan Humara Emaan -Ramzan Transmission (2016)

Acquired programming
 Roha
 Saif Aur Haya ki Kahani
 Sana Sanam Aur Sadia

See also
Aaj News
Play TV (Pakistan)
Play Entertainment
Business Recorder Group
List of Pakistani television stations

References

External links

Television stations in Pakistan
Urdu-language mass media
2015 establishments in Pakistan
Television stations in Karachi
Television channels and stations established in 2015